This is a list of British television related events from 1974.

Events

January
3 January – BBC1 show the first episode of the Second World War set comedy series It Ain't Half Hot Mum starring Windsor Davies.
5 January 
Debut of the children's Saturday morning television show Tiswas, hosted by Chris Tarrant.  The series starts as a local programme in the Midlands (on ATV) but is not shown on most ITV stations until September 1981 (and never in the Channel Islands).
Due to the ongoing overtime ban by the National Union of Mineworkers, strike action in the electricity supply industry and effects of the 1973 oil crisis which have led to a Three-Day Week, the government orders both the BBC and ITV television services to closedown early each night at 10:30pm to save electricity. The early closedowns will later alternate each day between the BBC and ITV. The early closedowns end on Friday 8 February following calling of the February 1974 United Kingdom general election.
7 January
A two-minute mid-afternoon regional news summary is broadcast on BBC1 for the first time. It is transmitted immediately before the start of the afternoon's children's programmes.
ITV launch the long running travel show Wish You Were Here...? hosted by Judith Chalmers.
30 January – BBC2 shows the first early morning Open University programming, airing between 6:40am and 7:30am.

February
12 February – BBC2 first airs the children's television series Bagpuss, made by Peter Firmin and Oliver Postgate's Smallfilms in stop motion animation. Despite just 13 episodes being made, the series becomes fondly remembered and gains a huge cult following. 
18 February – The American depression era family drama series The Waltons debuts on British television.
22 February – BBC2 airs the drama Girl as part of its Second City Firsts anthology series. The drama which tells the story of an affair between two army officers, is the first on British television to feature a gay kiss between two women.
February – The fifth of the five experimental community cable television channels, Wellingborough Cablevision, begins broadcasting.

March
No events.

April
6 April – The 19th Eurovision Song Contest is held at the Dome in Brighton, produced and transmitted by the BBC. Katie Boyle hosts the event for the fourth time. Sweden wins the contest with the song Waterloo, performed by ABBA who become the first group to win the contest. They go on to achieve huge international success.
April – The Annan Committee on the future of broadcasting is established to discuss the United Kingdom broadcasting industry, including new technologies and their funding, the role and funding of the BBC, Independent Broadcasting Authority and programme standards.

May
No events.

June
8 June – Jon Pertwee makes his final regular appearance as the Third Doctor in the concluding moments of Part Six of the Doctor Who serial Planet of the Spiders. Tom Baker briefly appears as the Fourth Doctor at the conclusion of the serial.

July
No events.

August
5 August – For the first time on a pre-school children's programme, the show Inigo Pipkin covers the death of the main character, Inigo, as the actor who played him (George Woodbridge) has died. The show is renamed Pipkins. This predates the Mr. Hooper death episode of Sesame Street by nine years.
24 August – BBC1 begins broadcasting the American police series Kojak starring Telly Savalas.

September
2 September – ITV launches the sitcom Rising Damp starring Leonard Rossiter and Richard Beckinsale.
5 September 
 ITV shows the feature length pilot episode of The Six Million Dollar Man, starring Lee Majors as the half-man, half-cyborg action hero Steve Austin.
 Following the pilot shown in April 1973, BBC1 commences with the Ronnie Barker comedy series Porridge.
23 September 
The BBC teletext service Ceefax goes live with 30 pages of information.
BBC Schools starts broadcasting programmes in colour.

October
16 October – The Welsh language soap Pobol y Cwm makes its debut on BBC Wales.
21 October – BBC1 airs the first episode of the children's animated series Roobarb, featuring Roobarb the green dog and Custard the pink cat.

November
No events.

December
5 December – Party Political Broadcast, the final episode of Monty Python's Flying Circus is broadcast on BBC2.
24 December – ITV Anglia exclusively screen the 1966 Batman movie, several years before other regions (ATV Midlands 9 April 1977, Granada and Tyne Tees 29 August 1977 and HTV 29 August 1978). 
28 December
BBC1 & BBC2 are rebranded with new logos and idents.
Tom Baker makes his first full appearance as the Fourth Doctor in the Doctor Who serial Robot.

Unknown
ITV begins developing the ORACLE teletext service. Dates for its launch are unclear but it becomes popular around 1980.

Debuts

BBC1
3 January – It Ain't Half Hot Mum (1974–1981)
7 January – Tom's Midnight Garden (1974)
18 January – Heidi (1974)
20 January – John Halifax, Gentleman (1974)
28 January – Carrie's War (1974)
20 February – Marty Back Together Again (1974)
15 March – Fall of Eagles (1974)
3 April – 
The Family (1974)
Shoulder to Shoulder (1974)
4 April – 
Barnaby Jones (1973–1980)
Seven Little Australians (1973)
9 April – The Electric Company (1971–1977)
10 April – The Prince of Denmark (1974)
17 April – No Strings (1974)
9 May – Happy Ever After (1974–1978)
20 May – Dial M for Murder (1974)
24 May – The Small World of Samuel Tweet (1974–1975)
9 July – Wodehouse Playhouse (1974–1978)
24 August – Kojak (1973–1978)
5 September – Porridge (1974–1977)
7 October – The Case of Eliza Armstrong (1974)
21 October – Roobarb (1974 BBC, 2005–2013 Channel 5)
20 October – Heidi (1974)
23 October – Second Time Around (1974–1975)
13 November – The Chinese Puzzle (1974)
22 November – Ken Dodd's World of Laughter (1974–1976)
1 December 
 David Copperfield (1974)
 The Gathering Storm (1974)
4 December – Francis Durbridge Presents: Melissa (1974)
20 December – Churchill's People (1974–1975)
31 December – Mr. Men (1974–1978, 1983–1988 reruns with Little Miss)
Unknown – Simon in the Land of Chalk Drawings (1974–1976)

BBC2
19 January – The Pallisers (1974)
12 February – Bagpuss (1974)
18 February – The Waltons (1972–1981)
3 March – Bedtime Stories (1974)
5 March – The Lady from the Sea (1974)
13 March – BBC2 Playhouse (1974–1982)
21 April – The Carnforth Practice (1974)
22 April – Masquerade (1974)
14 July – The Double Dealers (1974)
17 August – The Haggard Falcon (1974)
15 September – Network (1974–1980) (Anthology)
18 September – Microbes and Men (1974)
24 September - Look and Read: Cloud Burst (1974)
3 November – Notorious Woman (1974)
9 November – Cakes and Ale (1974)
17 November – The End of the Pier Show (1974–1976)
19 November – Rhoda (1974–1978)
30 November – The Early Life of Stephen Hind (1974)
1 December – A Day with Dana (1974–1975)
19 December – One-Upmanship (1974–1978)
28 December – An Unofficial Rose (1974–1975)

ITV
4 January – Within These Walls (1974–1978)
5 January – Tiswas (1974–1982)
7 January – Wish You Were Here...? (1974–2003, 2008)
16 January – Hold the Front Page (1974)
25 February – Zodiac (1974)
3 March – Not On Your Nellie (1974–1975)
5 March – Napoleon and Love  (1974)
10 March – Death or Glory Boy (1974)
16 March – Who Killed Lamb? (1974)
24 March – Boy Dominic  (1974; 1976)
5 April 
 The Aweful Mr. Goodall (1974)
 The Zoo Gang  (1974)
9 April – A Little Bit of Wisdom (1974–1976)
13 April – The Wheeltappers and Shunters Social Club (1974–1977)
14 April – Catholics: A Fable of the Future (1974)
21 April 
 Childhood (1974)
 Doctor at Sea (1974)
22 April – My Name Is Harry Worth (1974)
1 May – ...And Mother Makes Five (1974–1976)
3 May – My Old Man (1974–1975)
13 May – Skiboy  (1974)
24 May – Funny Ha-Ha (1974)
28 May – Armchair Cinema (1974–1975)
1 June – Thick as Thieves (1974)
2 June – Seven Faces of Woman (1974)
29 June – Moody and Pegg (1974–1975)
8 July –The Squirrels (1974–1977)
9 July – The Capone Investment (1974)
10 July 
 Julie on Sesame Street (1973)
 Late Night Drama (1974–1975)
15 July – Soldier and Me (1974)
16 July – Village Hall (1974–1975)
24 July – How's Your Father? (1974–1975)
27 July 
 Don't Drink the Water (1974–1975)
 Good Girl (1974)
 Vicky the Viking (1974–1975)
28 July – Antony and Cleopatra (1974)
4 August – The Nearly Man (1974–1975)
15 August – The Inheritors (1974)
1 September – Occupations (1974)
2 September – Rising Damp (1974–1978)
5 September – The Six Million Dollar Man (1973–1978)
13 September – The Russell Harty Show  (1974–1983)
15 September 
 The Top Secret Life of Edgar Briggs (1974)
 Miss Nightingale (1974)
16 September – South Riding (1974)
20 September – Intimate Strangers (1974)
23 September – Badger's Set (1974)
24 September – King Lear (1974)
26 September – Father Brown (1974)
29 September – Affairs of the Heart  (1974–1975)
30 September – Oh No It's Selwyn Froggitt (1974–1978)
2 October – Going a Bundle (1974–1976)
4 October – No, Honestly (1974–1975)
8 October – Graceless Go I (1974)
13 October – Planet of the Apes (1974–1975)
22 October – Jennie: Lady Randolph Churchill (1974)
5 November 
 Jennie (1974)
 Rooms (1974–1977)
6 November – Rogue's Rock (1974–1976)
13 November – Follow That Dog (1974)
31 December – The Canterville Ghost (1974)
Unknown – Don't Ask Me (1974–1978)

Continuing television shows

1920s
BBC Wimbledon (1927–1939, 1946–2019, 2021–present)

1930s
The Boat Race (1938–1939, 1946–2019)
BBC Cricket (1939, 1946–1999, 2020–2024)

1940s
Come Dancing (1949–1998)

1950s
Watch with Mother (1952–1975)
The Good Old Days (1953–1983)
Panorama (1953–present)
Dixon of Dock Green (1955–1976)
Crackerjack (1955–1984, 2020–present)
Opportunity Knocks (1956–1978, 1987–1990)
This Week (1956–1978, 1986–1992)
Armchair Theatre (1956–1974)
What the Papers Say (1956–2008)
The Sky at Night (1957–present)
Blue Peter (1958–present)
Grandstand (1958–2007)

1960s
Coronation Street (1960–present)
Songs of Praise (1961–present)
Z-Cars (1962–1978)
Animal Magic (1962–1983)
Doctor Who (1963–1989, 1996, 2005–present)
World in Action (1963–1998)
Top of the Pops (1964–2006)
Match of the Day (1964–present)
Crossroads (1964–1988, 2001–2003)
Play School (1964–1988)
Mr. and Mrs. (1965–1999)
Call My Bluff (1965–2005)
World of Sport (1965–1985)
Jackanory (1965–1996, 2006)
Sportsnight (1965–1997)
It's a Knockout (1966–1982, 1999–2001)
The Money Programme (1966–2010)
The Golden Shot (1967–1975)
Playhouse (1967–1982)
Dad's Army (1968–1977)
Magpie (1968–1980)
The Big Match (1968–2002)
The Benny Hill Show (1969–1989)
Nationwide (1969–1983)
Screen Test (1969–1984)

1970s
The Goodies (1970–1982)
Upstairs, Downstairs (1971–1975, 2010–2012)
The Onedin Line (1971–1980)
The Old Grey Whistle Test (1971–1987)
The Two Ronnies (1971–1987, 1991, 1996, 2005)
Love Thy Neighbour (1972–1976)
Thunderbirds (1972–1980, 1984–1987)
Clapperboard (1972–1982)
Crown Court (1972–1984)
Pebble Mill at One (1972–1986)
Are You Being Served? (1972–1985)
Rainbow (1972–1992)
Emmerdale (1972–present)
Newsround (1972–present)
Weekend World (1972–1988)
Pipkins (1973–1981)
We Are the Champions (1973–1987)
Last of the Summer Wine (1973–2010)
That's Life! (1973–1994)

Ending this year
 Unknown – Crystal Tipps and Alistair (1971–1974)
 1 February – The Protectors (1972–1974)
 1 April – Colditz (1972–1974)
 6 May – Bagpuss (1974)
 8 May – The World at War (1973–1974)
 9 May – Special Branch (1969–1974)
 9 July – Comedy Playhouse (1961–1974)
 10 October – Clangers (1969–1974, 2015–present)
 28 October – Sunday Night at the London Palladium (1955–1967, 1973–1974)
 5 December – Monty Python's Flying Circus (1969–1974)
 24 December – Whatever Happened to the Likely Lads? (1973–1974)
 26 December – Steptoe and Son (1962–1965, 1970–1974)
 31 December – Heidi (1974)

Births
 1 January – Clare Calbraith, actress
 2 January – Karin Giannone, newsreader
 12 January – Melanie Chisholm, English pop singer (Spice Girls)
 30 January – Olivia Colman, actress
 22 February – Chris Moyles, disc jockey
 21 March – Ursula Holden-Gill, actress (Emmerdale)
 11 April – Zöe Lucker, English actress
 17 April – Victoria Beckham, English pop singer and fashion designer (Spice Girls)
 24 April – David Vitty (Comedy Dave), radio and television host
 28 April – Vernon Kay – television presenter 
 1 May – Tamzin Malleson, actress
 8 May – Jon Tickle, English television host
 27 May – Denise Van Outen, actress and television presenter
 9 July – Dani Behr, singer, actress and television presenter
 14 July – David Mitchell, comedian and actor
 31 July – Emilia Fox, English actress
 21 August – Paul Chowdhry, comedian and actor
 23 August – Ray Park, Scottish actor
 17 October – Matthew Macfadyen, English actor
 4 November – Louise Redknapp, English singer
 11 December – Ben Shephard, television presenter
 12 December – Steven Arnold, actor
 13 December – Sara Cox, English television and radio presenter
 Unknown
 Mark Dymond, actor
 Alex Macqueen, actor

Deaths
29 May – James MacTaggart, television producer
22 August – Jacob Bronowski, scientist and presenter (The Ascent of Man)

See also
 1974 in British music
 1974 in British radio
 1974 in the United Kingdom
 List of British films of 1974

References